Ryan Michael McDonough (born November 20, 1980) is the former general manager of the Phoenix Suns of the National Basketball Association.

McDonough was hired by the Suns on May 7, 2013. He had previously worked for ten years in the Boston Celtics organization, serving in roles including director of international scouting and assistant general manager to former Suns player and head coach Danny Ainge. Under the assistant general manager role, McDonough would get an NBA Finals championship for the Celtics during the 2007–08 season. In his first season as executive of the Suns, he helped recreate the team to give them a 23-win improvement from the 2012–13 season to the 2013–14 season. Despite that, however, he would end up being runner-up for the NBA Executive of the Year Award to R. C. Buford. While McDonough wouldn't reach the same success that he had in his first season with the Suns throughout the rest of his tenure, he still managed to receive a contract extension with Phoenix on July 19, 2017. He also made the primary decision to draft Deandre Ayton as the Suns' first ever #1 pick in 2018.

McDonough was fired from his job as the Suns' General Manager on October 8, 2018. James Jones would go on to replace McDonough during the 2018–19 NBA season and eventually be hired as the permanent general manager.

McDonough is currently an insider and podcast host for Entercom and RADIO.COM Sports.

Personal life
McDonough is the son of Boston Globe columnist writer Will McDonough, as well as the brother of ESPN sportscaster and former Boston Red Sox sportscaster Sean McDonough and current Arizona Cardinals vice president of player personnel Terry McDonough. Ryan is married to Valerie as of July 24, 2015.

References

External links
Suns bio
Profile at sbnation.com

1980 births
Living people
Boston Celtics executives
National Basketball Association general managers
Phoenix Suns executives
University of North Carolina at Chapel Hill alumni